The Co-Cathedral of the Assumption of Mary (also called Senj Co-Cathedral) is a Catholic church in Senj, Croatia. It was once the main cathedral of the Diocese of Senj and is now the co-cathedral of the Diocese of Gospić-Senj.

The façade and the south side of the cathedral was decorated with Romanesque arches and brick niches in the mid-eighteenth century. During the same period the church was expanded with the addition of two side aisles, altars and other works of art. During World War II the cathedral was severely damaged. The building's current appearance is the result of a 1949–1950 restoration.

See also
Roman Catholicism in Croatia
Assumption Cathedral

References

Roman Catholic cathedrals in Croatia
Senj
Buildings and structures in Lika-Senj County